The 2nd Cavalry Brigade was a brigade of the British Army. It served in the Napoleonic Wars (2nd Union Cavalry Brigade), the Boer War and in the First World War when it was assigned to the 1st Cavalry Division.

Prior to World War I the brigade was based at Tidworth Camp in England; and originally consisted of three cavalry regiments and a Royal Engineers signal troop. After the declaration of war in August 1914, the brigade was deployed to the Western Front in France, where an artillery battery joined the brigade the following September and a Machine Gun Squadron in February 1916.

History

Napoleonic Wars

From June 1809, Wellington organized his cavalry into one, later two, cavalry divisions (1st and 2nd) for the Peninsular War.  These performed a purely administrative, rather than tactical, role; the normal tactical headquarters were provided by brigades commanding two, later usually three, regiments.  The cavalry brigades were named for the commanding officer, rather than numbered.  For the Hundred Days Campaign, he numbered his British cavalry brigades in a single sequence, 1st to 7th.  The 2nd Cavalry Brigade consisted of:
1st (Royal) Regiment of Dragoons
2nd Regiment of Dragoons (Royal Scots Greys)
6th (Inniskilling) Dragoons
As the brigade consisted of regiments from England (1st Dragoons), Scotland (2nd Dragoons) and Ireland (6th Dragoons), it was known as the 2nd (Union) Cavalry Brigade.

Boer War
The brigade was reformed for the Boer War.  During the Battle of Paardeberg, the brigade commanded:
6th Dragoon Guards (Carabiners)
2nd Dragoons (Royal Scots Greys)
6th (Inniskilling) Dragoons
New Zealanders
Australians
G and P Batteries, Royal Horse Artillery

World War I

4th (Royal Irish) Dragoon Guards
9th (Queen’s Royal) Lancers
18th (Queen Mary’s Own) Hussars
2nd Signal Troop, Royal Engineers
H Battery, Royal Horse Artillery from 28 September 1914
2nd Cavalry Brigade Machine Gun Squadron Machine Gun Corps

Commanders
The commanders of the 2nd Cavalry Brigade during the First World War were:
Brigadier-General H. de B. de Lisle (At mobilization)
Brigadier-General R. L. Mullens (12 October 1914)
Brigadier-General D. J. E. Beale-Browne (26 October 1915)
Brigadier-General A. Lawson (16 April 1918)

See also

Order of battle of the Waterloo Campaign
British Army during World War I
British Cavalry Corps order of battle 1914
British cavalry during the First World War

Notes

References

Bibliography

External links
 

Cavalry brigades of the British Army
Military units and formations established in 1815
Military units and formations disestablished in 1815
Military units and formations established in 1899
Military units and formations disestablished in 1902
Military units and formations established in 1914
Military units and formations disestablished in 1919